Robert James Irvine (born 17 January 1942) is a Northern Irish former footballer who played in the Football League for Stoke City. His younger brother Willie was a star striker for Burnley in the sixties.

Club career

Linfield
Irvine was signed by Linfield as a teenager in 1957 from Carrick Tech and established himself in the first team at Windsor Park when at 16. In the fifties, he featured in some of the south Belfast club's earliest European Cup games. Irvine found disfavour with the Linfield selection committee during the 1960–61 season and at one stage it seemed he would be released.

Stoke City
In June 1963 Irvine was transferred to Stoke City for £6,000 and made his debut in the opening game of the season, a 2–1 defeat of Spurs. He lost his place after seven games, however, to Lawrie Leslie and remained out of the side for the most of the season. Irvine did pick up a League Cup runners-up medal at the end of his first season. He was largely out of favour in 1964–65, making just one league appearance but returned to the first team the following year. Irvine was given the honour of captaining Stoke in a League Cup tie against Burnley, who were captained in that game by his brother Willie. The idea of them both captaining their sides came from Clarets' manager Harry Potts. The brothers met in the centre circle to shake hands and toss the coin and then played against each other for the first time since schooldays. Irvine's career at the Victoria Ground was brought to an end after an FA Cup third-round game against Walsall. He gave away a penalty that helped the Third Division side to a 2–0 win. Furious with Irvine's antics, manager Tony Waddington never picked him again.

International career
Irvine was capped at both schoolboy and Under 23 level for Northern Ireland before making his senior debut against the Netherlands in Rotterdam in 1962. He was brought in to replace Harry Gregg and would keep his place for the next six international matches. Irvine made his eighth and final international appearance in 1965 against Wales.

Career statistics

Club
Source:

International
Source:

References

External links
Northern Ireland's Footballing Greats

1942 births
Association football goalkeepers
Association footballers from Northern Ireland
Northern Ireland international footballers
Linfield F.C. players
Stoke City F.C. players
Ulster Scots people
Living people
English Football League players